The William Brown Library and Museum is a Grade II* listed building situated on the historic William Brown Street in Liverpool, England. The building currently houses part of the World Museum Liverpool and Liverpool Central Library.

The William Brown Library and Museum building was conceived as a replacement for the Derby Museum (containing the Earl of Derby's natural history collection) which then shared two rooms on the city's Duke Street with a library. The land for the building on what was then called Shaw's Brow as well as much of the funding was provided by local MP and merchant Sir William Brown, 1st Baronet of Astrop, in whose honour the street was renamed.

Following on from the then-recently completed St. George's Hall across the street, the new building was designed by Thomas Allom in a classical style including Corinthian columns and was modified by the Liverpool Corporation architect John Weightman. The new building opened its doors in 1860 with 400,000 people attending the opening ceremony.

With Liverpool being one of the country's key ports, much of the city was badly damaged by German bombing during the Second World War and William Brown Library and Museum were no exception. Hit by firebombs during the blitz in 1941, the building was ravaged by fire and much of the building had to be rebuilt. Key parts of the museum's collection had been previously moved to less vulnerable locations and damage to those avoided.

Plans have now been brought forward to redevelop the library, replacing the post–World War II additions with state-of-the-art facilities.

See also
Architecture of Liverpool

References

External links
 History
 External night photo
 External night photo
Images of England:William Brown Library and Museum 

Infrastructure completed in 1860
Museums established in 1860
Museums in Liverpool
Libraries in Merseyside
Grade II* listed buildings in Liverpool 
Grade II* listed library buildings
Grade II* listed museum buildings
Brown, William, Library and Museum
1860 establishments in England
Neoclassical architecture in Liverpool